Alexandre V. Borovik (born 1956) is a Professor of Pure Mathematics at the University of Manchester, United Kingdom. He was born in Russia and graduated from Novosibirsk State University in 1978.  His principal research lies in algebra, model theory, and combinatorics—topics on which he published several monographs and a number of papers. He also has an interest in mathematical practice: his book Mathematics under the Microscope: Notes on Cognitive Aspects of Mathematical Practice examines a mathematician's outlook on psychophysiological and cognitive issues in mathematics.

Selected books and articles

.
 Borovik, Alexandre; Nesin, Ali: Groups of finite Morley rank. Oxford Logic Guides, 26. Oxford Science Publications. The Clarendon Press, Oxford University Press, New York, 1994
Borovik, Alexandre V.; Gelfand, I. M.; White, Neil: Coxeter matroids. Progress in Mathematics, 216. Birkhäuser Boston, Inc., Boston, MA, 2003.
.

Notes

External links
 Personal page
 Mathematics under the Microscope

Living people
20th-century British mathematicians
21st-century British mathematicians
British logicians
Model theorists
1956 births